Fate of Alakada: The Party Planner also known as Fate of Alakada is a 2020 Nigerian action comedy film written by Moshood Yakubu Olawale and Ozioma Ogbaji, and directed by Kayode Kasum. The film stars Toyin Abraham, Mercy Eke and Broda Shaggi in the lead roles. This was the fifth film in the Alakada franchise and it was also the sequel to the 2017 comedy film Alakada Reloaded. The film is based on poking fun at social media fakeness and the current Nigerian pop culture. The film had its theatrical release on 1 October 2020 coinciding with the Independence Day of Nigeria and opened to extremely positive reviews. It also became a box office success and also eventually became the highest grossing Nigerian film of 2020.

Cast 

 Toyin Abraham as Yetunde
 Broda Shaggi as Kas
 Mercy Eke as herself
 MC Lively
 Stephanie Coker
 Mabel Makun as herself
 Odunlade Adekola
 Alex Asogwa as herself
 Timini Egbuson as Ochuko
 Toyin Lawani
 Davido
 Peruzzi

Synopsis 
Yetunde (Toyin Abraham), a woman with an inferiority complex and hailing from a simple background, indulges in the act of fabricating stories regarding her financial and social status through social media to fit in with the creme de la creme.

Production 
Film producer and actress Toyin Abraham announced her plan regarding making of a sequel to Alakada Reloaded (2017) in an Instagram post on 28 November 2019. It was also taunted to be the fourth film in the Alakada film series after Alakada (2009), Alakada 2 (2013) and Alakada Reloaded (2017). The principal photography of the film commenced on 16 December 2019.

Nigerian television show host Stephanie Coker, 4th season of Big Brother Naija winner Mercy Eke and fashion designer, entrepreneur Toyin Lawani all made their film acting debuts through this film. Popular Instagram influencer Broda Shaggi also landed a pivotal role in the film. The first look poster of the film was unveiled in February 2020.

Release 
The film was initially supposed to have its theatrical release on 10 April 2020 but the release was postponed to 1 October 2020 due to the COVID-19 pandemic induced lockdown. The film was released in limited seating capacity in Lagos with only 33% was allocated to operate and 50% in other states by the Government of Nigeria.

It started streaming on Netflix on 5 March 2021.

Box office 
The film collected over ₦28 million within just four days despite the restricted seating capacity due to the COVID-19. The film grossed ₦17,396,200 in the first nine days after its release. It grossed over ₦30 million in its opening weekend and it was depicted as a major feat by the film critics considering the COVID-19 uncertainties and it also became one of only few Nigerian films to have grossed ₦20 million in the opening weekend in the Cinema of Nigeria. It also became the highest grossing Nigerian film in an opening weekend post the lockdown. The final box office collection of the film stood at ₦112,149,600 and went onto become the highest grossing Nigerian film in 2020. The film also became 14th highest grossing Nigerian film of all-time.

Controversy 
The lead actress of the film Toyin Abraham was severely criticised and slammed in the social media for promoting the film via Twitter in October 2020 amid the End SARS nationwide protests. She was also criticised for not taking part in the movement and instead was seen promoting the film.

References

External links 

 

2020 action comedy films
English-language Nigerian films
Films shot in Lagos
Nigerian action comedy films
Nigerian sequel films
Films directed by Kayode Kasum
2020s English-language films